HMS Glory was a 32-gun fifth-rate  frigate of the Royal Navy, and was the second Royal Navy ship to bear this name.

Career

HMS Glory was ordered during the Seven Years' War, but completed too late for that conflict. She was placed in Ordinary and was not commissioned until May 1769 under Capt. John Hollwall, for the Duke of Cumberland's squadron in the Channel. She was paid off Jan 1773 and was renamed HMS Apollo 30 Aug 1774. Afterwards she underwent a large repair at Plymouth from 1776 to 1777. She was recommissioned in January 1777 under Capt. Philemon Pownall and sailed for North America.

Action of 15 Jun 1780

Apollos opponent was the 26-gun French privateer Stanislaus, and after nearly an hour of intense cannonading Pownall was hit by a cannonball and killed. Command of Apollo devolved to Edward Pellew as the first lieutenant, who continued the fight, eventually driving the Stanislaus on shore. Apart from her captain, Apollo lost five men killed and had twenty wounded.

Fate
She was broken up at Woolwich Dockyard 30 Jan 1786.

Citations

References
 
 Winfield, Rif (2007) British Warships in the Age of Sail, 1714-1792. Seaforth Publishing. .

 

1763 ships
Fifth-rate frigates of the Royal Navy